Log9 Materials is an Indian nanotechnology company, headquartered in Bangalore, operating in the areas of sustainable energy and filtration. With 16 patents around Graphene, Log9 Materials has developed Aluminium–air battery, aluminium fuel cells for both mobility and stationary energy applications. Log9 was awarded "Most Innovative Technology Company of 2018" by the Department of Science and Technology (India), Government of India.

History
Log9 was founded by Akshay Singhal along with Kartik Hajela in 2015 and has acquired 16 patents in graphene synthesis and graphene products. It is the first start-up to be incubated by IIT Roorkee in its business incubator TIDES. In 2017, Log9 secured its first round of funding led by Gems Partners, a micro venture capital fund, to establish its own research & development center in Bangalore and tied up with the Indian Institute of Science to build products jointly using the latter's analytical and research capabilities.

The company has set up its subsidiary in Mumbai by the name of Log9 Spill Containment, a graphene-based product development company that specializes in oil and chemical spill containment solutions.
In 2017, Indian defence tied up with Log9 for the deployment of nanotechnology.

Funding
In 2019, Log9 Materials raised $3.5 Million Series A funding led by Sequoia Capital and Exfinity Venture Partners.

Awards
 2018: Awarded "Most Innovative Technology Company of 2018" by Department of Science and Technology (India)

References

External links
 Official website

Nanotechnology companies
Technology companies established in 2015
Companies based in Bangalore
Manufacturing companies based in Bangalore
Chemical companies of India
Indian companies established in 2015
Manufacturing companies established in 2015
2015 establishments in Karnataka